The Karatal (Karatal; Khalkha Mongolian: Хартал Hartal, "Black Steppe"), also known as the Qaratal River (Qaratal), is a river of the Balkhash-Alakol Basin, Kazakhstan. It originates in the Dzungarian Alatau Mountains near the border with China and flows into Lake Balkhash. It is the easternmost of two large rivers that flow into the lake; the other is the Ili. The Karatal is one of the main rivers of the historic region of Zhetysu.

The river flows west-southwest from the border with China before turning northwestward south of Taldykorgan and then northward when it reaches the Saryesik-Atyrau Desert, a large sand desert south of Lake Balkhash. The river empties into Lake Balkhash near the centerpoint of its southern side. Karatal freezes up in December and stays icebound until March. Because of irrigation, the river's flow into Lake Balkash is limited.

Description
The Karatal is the second largest river after the Ili in the territory of Semirechye. Translated from the Kazakh language, the river is translated as "Black willow".

Fauna
From the South, the river Koksu flows into the Karatal. The river is home to pelicans, several species of ducks, herons, and other birds.

References 

Rivers of Kazakhstan
Tributaries of Lake Balkhash